Lord Falmouth may refer to:
 Viscount Falmouth, a title in the peerage of England
 a Solenostemon scutellarioides cultivar